Belgium was represented by Serge and Christine Ghisoland, with the song "À la folie ou pas du tout", at the 1972 Eurovision Song Contest, which took place in Edinburgh on 25 March. "À la folie ou pas du tout" was the winner of the Belgian national final for the contest, held at the RTB studios in Brussels on 15 February. The Ghisolands had previously participated in the Belgian final in 1970.

Before Eurovision

Artist selection
In October 1971, RTB announced that they had internally selected Serge and Christine Ghisoland to represent Belgium in the Eurovision Song Contest 1972.

Chansons pour l'Eurovision 72
Chansons pour l'Eurovision 72 was the national final format developed by RTB in order to select Belgium's entry for the Eurovision Song Contest 1972. The competition was held on 15 February 1972 and was broadcast on RTB.

Competing entries
Following the announcement of the Ghisolands as Belgian representatives, a song submission period was opened where composers were able to submit their songs until 31 December 1971. RTB, in collaboration with SABAM, selected ten songs from the received songs to participate in the contest.

Semi-final
The semi-final was held on 28 January from 20:15 to 21:35 CET, with ten songs competing, from which four were selected for the final.

Final
The final was held on 15 February 1972 from 20:10 to 20:50 CET. Four songs competed in the contest with the winner being decided upon by postcard voting and televoting.

At Eurovision 
On the night of the final the Ghisolands performed 16th in the running order, following Monaco and preceding eventual winner Luxembourg. The song seemed rather quaint and old-fashioned in comparison to many of the year's other entries, and at the close of the voting "À la folie ou pas du tout" had received 55 points, placing Belgium 17th of the 18 entries, ahead only of Malta.

Voting

References 

1972
Countries in the Eurovision Song Contest 1972
Eurovision